Darlingia is a small genus of two species of rainforest tree from Northern Queensland. It was described by Ferdinand von Mueller in 1866.

References

Proteaceae
Endemic flora of Queensland
Proteales of Australia
Proteaceae genera